Frutigen District was a district in the canton of Bern in Switzerland with its seat at Frutigen. It included seven municipalities in an area of 490 km²:

References
This article is based on a translation of an article from the German Wikipedia.

External links

 Adelboden
 Aeschi b/Spiez
 Frutigen
 Kandergrund
 Kandersteg
 Krattigen
 Reichenbach i/Kandertal

Former districts of the canton of Bern